Giampaolo Parisi (born 17 July 1979) is an Italian footballer who last played for Manfredonia.

External links
Profile at Football.it 
Profile at FIGC 

Italian footballers
Italy under-21 international footballers
U.S. Salernitana 1919 players
U.S. Avellino 1912 players
Calcio Foggia 1920 players
Association football defenders
Sportspeople from the Province of Salerno
1979 births
Living people
Footballers from Campania